The 2008–09 season was Feyenoord, in Dutch Eredivisie. the first season under new coach Gertjan Verbeek. On 14 January 2009, the bigger part of the players group declared they did not have any confidence in Gertjan Verbeek. Although the board and the supporters completely backed up Verbeek, the choice was made to sack the trainer because of financial considerations. The rest of the season Leon Vlemmings, who was Verbeek's assistant from the start of the season, was the manager.

Competitions

Overall

Eredivisie

League table

Results summary

Matches

UEFA Cup Playoff

Johan Cruyff Shield

KNVB Cup

UEFA Cup

Friendlies

Player details

Transfers

In:

Out:

Club

Coaching staff

Kit

|
|
|
|

References

Feyenoord seasons
Dutch football clubs 2008–09 season